Ro-101 was an Imperial Japanese Navy  submarine. Completed and commissioned in October 1942, she served in World War II and operated in the Solomon Islands and the New Guinea area until she was sunk in September 1943 during her eighth war patrol.

Design and description
The Ro-100 class was a medium-sized, coastal submarine derived from the preceding Kaichū type. They displaced  surfaced and  submerged.

For surface running, the boats were powered by two  diesel engines, each driving one propeller shaft. When submerged each propeller was driven by a  electric motor. They could reach  on the surface and  underwater.

The boats were armed with four internal bow  torpedo tubes and carried a total of eight torpedoes. They were also armed with two single mounts for  Type 96 anti-aircraft guns or a single  L/40 AA gun.

Construction and commissioning

Ro-101 was laid down as Submarine No. 211 on 30 September 1941 by Kawasaki at Kobe, Japan. She had been renamed Ro-101 by the time she was launched on 17 April 1942. She was completed and commissioned on 31 October 1942.

Service history

October 1942–January 1943
Upon commissioning, Ro-101 was attached to the Kure Submarine Squadron. After completing workups in the Seto Inland Sea, she proceeded to Yokosuka. On 18 January 1943, she departed Yokosuka bound for Truk, which she reached on 25 January 1943.

First war patrol

On 8 February 1943, Ro-101 departed Truk to begin her first war patrol, assigned a patrol area east of Port Moresby, New Guinea, to provide distant cover for Operation Ke, the Japanese evacuation of their forces on Guadalcanal which brought the Guadalcanal campaign to an end after six months of fighting. The patrol was uneventful, and on 8 February 1943, the day the Japanese completed Operation Ke, she concluded the patrol with her arrival at Rabaul on New Britain.

Second war patrol

Ro-101 got underway in company with the submarine  from Rabaul on 9 February 1943 for her second war patrol, again bound for a patrol area east of Port Moresby. On 22 February 1943, her navigator sighted a 4,000-gross register ton steamer. After viewing the steamer through the periscope, Ro-101s commanding officer concluded that the steamer was a Q-ship, an antisubmarine decoy ship armed with hidden guns and depth charges. He decided to wait for dark to attack, but when the ship put on speed and headed off in the direction of Port Moresby, Ro-101 lost contact with it. Ro-101 departed her patrol area on 25 February and returned to Rabaul on 28 February 1943.

March 1943

In the Battle of the Bismarck Sea, fought between 2 and 4 March 1943, United States Army Air Forces and Royal Australian Air Force aircraft and United States Navy PT boats annihilated a Japanese convoy in the Bismarck Sea that was attempting to carry the Imperial Japanese Army's 51st Division to Lae on New Guinea, sinking all eight ships of the convoy and four of the eight destroyers escorting them. Ro-101 got underway from Rabaul on the afternoon of 4 March 1943 to rescue survivors. On 7 March 1943, she picked up the commanding officer of the collier  and 44 infantrymen from lifeboats off the northern coast of New Guinea south of Dampier Strait.

Ro-101 called briefly at Rabaul on 8 March 1943 to discharge the survivors, then put back to sea the same day to come to the assistance of Ro-103, which had run aground on a reef off Kiriwina in the Trobriand Islands. Ro-103 freed herself on 11 March 1943 before Ro-101 could reach the scene, so Ro-101 received orders to return to Rabaul. She again got underway from Rabaul on 19 March 1943 to conduct a war patrol southeast of Guadalcanal, but she soon had to return when most of her crew fell ill with food poisoning.

Third war patrol

Ro-101 departed Rabaul on 21 March 1943 for her third war patrol, assigned a patrol area in the Solomon Islands and tasked with conducting air-sea rescue and weather reporting services in addition to attacking Allied ships while on patrol. On 5 April 1943 she received orders to proceed to Cape Esperance on the northwestern tip of Guadalcanal to rescue the crew of a Japanese bomber that had been shot down, but when she arrived in the Cape Esperance area U.S. Navy PT boats prevented her from carrying out the rescue. She returned to Rabaul on 12 April 1943.

Fourth war patrol

Ro-101 departed Rabaul on 30 April to begin her fourth war patrol, ordered to relieve the submarine   in a patrol area in the Samarai Bight southeast of Rabi, New Guinea. She operated in that area from 10 to 17 May 1943, then headed back to Rabaul. While en route, she was off Cape St. George on New Ireland at 03:40 on 21 May 1943 when she sighted a four-engine bomber — probably the United States Army Air Forces B-17E Flying Fortress Honi Kuu Okole (Hawaiian for "Kiss My Heart"), which was operating from Dobodura Airfield on New Guinea that night when a Japanese Nakajima J1N1 (Allied reporting name "Irving") night fighter shot it down — crashing in flames and observed two parachutes from the plane. She arrived at Rabaul later that day. During her stay at Rabaul, she was fitted with a radar detector.

Fifth war patrol

Ro-101 departed Rabaul on 8 June 1943 for her fifth war patrol, assigned a patrol area east of Guadalcanal. She arrived in her patrol area on 12 June 1943, and on 17 June 1943 received orders to move to a new patrol area in the vicinity of Munda and Gatukai Island in the New Georgia Islands. She was ordered to return to Rabaul on 29 June 1943, but before she left her patrol area, the New Georgia campaign began on 30 June 1943 with the U.S. landings on New Georgia, Rendova, and other islands in the central Solomon Islands. Ro-101 sighted U.S. landing craft while submerged off Munda that day and reported them to Submarine Squadron 7. She was ordered to approach from west of Rendova and attack ships off the U.S. landing area at Munda, but she was unable to penetrate the PT boat screen protecting the beachhead. She made a second attempt on 2 July 1943, but again failed to penetrate the PT boat screen, and after she withdrew to recharge her batteries she received orders to return to Rabaul, which she reached on 3 July 1943.

Sixth war patrol

On 8 July 1943, Ro-101 began her sixth war patrol, ordered to return to the central Solomon Islands and attack ships in Kula Gulf off the U.S. beachhead at Rice Anchorage on the northern coast of New Georgia. Taylor closed the range, and at 16:54 her lookouts sighted Ro-101s conning tower at a distance of only . Taylor illuminated Ro-101 with a searchlight and opened fire, immediately killing the submarine's torpedo officer and two of her lookouts. Ro-101s commanding officer had to move their bodies out of the way so that he could gain access to the conning tower hatch, and after he entered the conning tower and the hatch was closed, Ro-101 belatedly crash-dived. She went out of control during the dive, reaching , and had to blow her main ballast tanks to arrest her descent. At 17:10 Taylor dropped two depth charges, which damaged one of Ro-101s periscopes.

She remained submerged for two hours after Taylors depth-charge attack, and her interior temperature rose to  before she surfaced toward evening. She headed for the northwest coast of Kolombangara so her crew could inspect her damage and make repairs. The crew found several dents in her hull and determined that her damaged periscope required replacement.

After sunset, Ro-101s crew observed searchlights and heard heavy gunfire to seaward as U.S. and Japanese warships fought the Battle of Kolombangara. In its aftermath, she received orders to rescue survivors from the light cruiser , which had been sunk in the battle, but her damage prevented her from carrying out the orders. She headed for Rabaul, and while she was on the surface recharging her batteries west of Shortland Island on the afternoon of 13 July 1943, an Allied patrol plane attacked, dropping two bombs as she crash-dived and knocking out her remaining periscope. She reached Rabaul on 14 July 1943 and began repairs, which took three weeks.

Seventh war patrol

After completion of her repairs, Ro-101 got underway from Rabaul on 7 August 1943 to begin her seventh war patrol, ordered to return to the Kolombangara area. At around 01:00 on 18 August 1943, her commanding officer observed the flashes of gunfire to the north through her periscope as U.S. and Japanese destroyers fought the Battle off Horaniu. At 02:00, she made sound contact on the propeller noises of destroyers in New Georgia Sound, and she quickly set up an attack and fired four torpedoes at the second destroyer in the column at a range of only , but they all passed astern because the destroyer was making  and Ro-101′s commanding officer had underestimated her speed.

On 20 August 1943, Ro-101 was reassigned to Submarine Division 51 along with the submarine . She returned to Rabaul on 26 August 1943. Her commanding officer received orders to relinquish his command for a new assignment after her return, but her new commanding officer was killed on 28 August 1943 when a U.S Navy PB4Y-1 Liberator shot down the Kawanishi H6K (Allied reporting name "Mavis") flying boat on which he was a passenger off Bougainville during a flight from Truk to Rabaul. Another officer was selected to replace him as her new commanding officer.

Eighth war patrol

Ro-101 departed Simpson Harbour at Rabaul on 10 September 1943 for her eighth war patrol. She was assigned a patrol area in the southeastern Solomon Islands southeast of San Cristobal.

Loss
On 15 September 1943, a Japanese submarine attacked a convoy of two cargo ships bound for Espiritu Santo in the New Hebrides as the convoy passed through the southern end of Indispensable Strait near Guadalcanal. The convoy's escorts — the light minelayer  and the destroyer  — sighted a torpedo wake at 10:11. Saufley made five depth-charge attacks over the next three and a half hours, and the submarine surfaced at 14:43. Saufley opened fire on the submarine's conning tower with her  guns and machine guns, and a PBY-5 Catalina flying boat of U.S. Navy Patrol Squadron 23 (VP-23) arrived on the scene and dropped two depth charges. The first missed, but the second hit the submarine, which disappeared beneath the surface at 14:46.

The submarine Saufley and the PBY sank probably was Ro-101. On 11 October 1943, the Imperial Japanese Navy declared her to be presumed lost in the Solomon Islands with all 50 hands. Her torpedo officer at the time of her loss was Lieutenant (posthumously Lieutenant Commander) Tokugawa Hiromi, a grandson of Tokugawa Yoshinobu, the 15th and last shōgun of the Tokugawa shogunate of Japan. The Japanese struck her from the Navy list on 1 December 1943.

Notes

References
 

Ships built by Kawasaki Heavy Industries
1942 ships
World War II submarines of Japan
Japanese submarines lost during World War II
Ro-100-class submarines
Submarines sunk by aircraft
Submarines sunk by United States warships
Ships lost with all hands
World War II shipwrecks in the Pacific Ocean
Maritime incidents in September 1943